Niek Versteegen (born 12 October 1994) is a Dutch football player who plays for SV Venray.

Club career
He made his professional debut in the Eerste Divisie for Achilles '29 on 16 September 2016 in a game against SC Telstar and scored a goal 5 minutes after coming on as a substitute.

In the summer 2019, Versteegen joined SV Venray.

References

External links
 
 

1994 births
Living people
Dutch footballers
Achilles '29 players
De Treffers players
Eerste Divisie players
Tweede Divisie players
Association football forwards
People from Venray
Footballers from Limburg (Netherlands)